Louise Lester (August 8, 1867 – November 18, 1952) was an American silent film actress. She was the first female star of Western films.

Biography
Lester was born in Milwaukee, Wisconsin, on August 8, 1867.

In 1884, Lester headed the Louise Lester Opera Company.

Lester came to California in 1910 with one of the first companies assembled to make motion pictures. She made her debut in movies as a member of the Flying A Company in Santa Barbara, California after a career on stage. She starred in over 150 films before her retirement in 1935.

Lester is most famous for starring as Calamity Anne in a series of films based around the character. She also starred with William Garwood in films such as The Oath of Pierre.

The actress' married name was Louise Lester Beal. She was the widow of Frank Beal, a film director. She was also married to actor Jack Richardson.

On November 18, 1952, Lester died at the Motion Picture Country Home, aged 85. Her funeral was conducted in the chapel of the Utter-McKinley Strouthers Mortuary, 6240 Hollywood Boulevard. The services were conducted by the Baháʼí Faith. Her interment was in the Inglewood, California Park Cemetery.

Calamity Anne 
Lester created the Calamity Anne character and was dramatist for the series. She starred as Calamity Anne in a series of fifteen short films based around the character, playing the lead role in films such as Calamity Anne's Inheritance, Calamity Anne's Vanity, Calamity Anne's Beauty, and Calamity Anne, Heroine all in 1913. The series continued for another four years, with the final film being Calamity Anne's Protégé, released in 1917.

Selected filmography

 The Opium Smuggler (1911, Short) - Mrs. Watson
 Calamity Anne's Ward (1912, Short) - Calamity Anne
 Calamity Anne's Inheritance (1913, Short) - Calamity Anne
 Calamity Anne's Vanity (1913, Short) - Calamity Anne
 Calamity Anne, Detective (1913, Short) - Calamity Anne
 Calamity Anne's Beauty (1913, Short) - Calamity Anne
 Calamity Anne's Parcel Post (1913, Short) - Calamity Anne
 Calamity Anne Takes a Trip (1913, Short) - Calamity Anne
 Calamity Anne, Heroine (1913, Short) - Calamity Anne
 Calamity Anne's Sacrifice (1913, Short) - Calamity Anne
 Calamity Anne's Dream (1913, Short) - Calamity Anne
 Rose of San Juan (1913, Short) - Ozozco's Mother
 Calamity Anne in Society (1914, Short) - Calamity Anne
 Calamity Anne's Love Affair (1914, Short) - Calamity Anne
 The Strength o' Ten (1914, Short) - Betty's Mother
 The Poet of the Peaks (1915, Short) - Mrs. Davis
 The Day of Reckoning (1915, Short) - Mrs. Crew
 Mountain Mary (1915, Short) - Mary Doone - Ivan's Mother
 The Honor of the District Attorney (1915, Short) - Nora Mortimer - Dora's Mother
 The Newer Way (1915, Short) - Mrs. Bates
 The Exile of Bar-K Ranch (1915, Short) - Mrs. Jack Donald - Millie's Mother
 The Assayer of Lone Gap (1915, Short) - Mrs. Dugan - Belle's Mother
 Drawing the Line (1915, Short)
 In Trust (1915, Short) - Molly
 The Little Lady Next Door (1915, Short) - The Housekeeper
 The Barren Gain (1915, Short) - Mrs. Cameron - Philip's Mother
 Hearts in Shadow (1915, Short) - Mrs. Burke
 Profit from Loss (1915, Short) - Mrs. Dean
 The Silken Spider (1916, Short) - Ursula Jacques
 April (1916) - Martha Fagan
 Tangled Skeins (1916, Short) - Mrs. Wellington
 Dust (1916) - Mina's mother
 Calamity Anne, Guardian (1916, Short) - Calamity Anne
 Calamity Anne's New Job (1917, Short) - Calamity Anne
 Calamity Anne's Protégé (1917, Short) - Calamity Anne
 The Reckoning Day (1918) - Mrs. Schram
 The Mayor of Filbert (1919) - Belle Glover
 The Outcasts of Poker Flat (1919)
 The Luck of the Irish (1920) - The Landlady
 Her Reputation (1923) - Consuelo
 The Desert Hawk (1924) - Bridget
 Galloping On (1925) - Mrs. Moore - Wally's Mother
 Second Choice (1930) - Minor Role (uncredited)
 Wide Open (1930) - Office Worker (uncredited)
 Straight from the Heart (1935) - Woman (uncredited) (final film role)

References

External links
 
 

American film actresses
American stage actresses
Western (genre) film actresses
American silent film actresses
Actresses from Milwaukee
1867 births
1952 deaths
20th-century American actresses